Countryside La Vie Magazine is a British regional bi-monthly magazine, distributed throughout Leicestershire and Rutland.

History
Countryside La Vie was launched in 1993 as a property and lifestyle magazine. The magazine was the brainchild of a small family group wanting to concentrate on promoting local charitable organisations in and around Leicestershire.

Over the last 20 years the magazine has evolved and encompasses every aspect of Leicestershire life, whilst including world and celebrity news.

Editors
 Marlene Bowley (1993 - 2006)
 Sue Brindley (2006–Present)

References

External links
 Countryside La Vie Website

1993 establishments in the United Kingdom
Bi-monthly magazines published in the United Kingdom
Lifestyle magazines published in the United Kingdom
Magazines published in England
Magazines established in 1993
Mass media in Leicester